The following outline is provided as an overview of and topical guide to sustainable agriculture:

Sustainable agriculture – applied science that integrates three main goals, environmental health, economic profitability, and social and economic equity. These goals have been defined by various philosophies, policies, and practices, from the vision of farmers and consumers. Perspectives and approaches are very diverse. The following topics intend to help understand sustainable agriculture.

Introduction 

 Agroecology
 Alan Chadwick
 Biodynamic agriculture
 Ecoagriculture
 French intensive gardening
 Horticulture
 John D. Hamaker
 Lady Eve Balfour
 Organic farming
 Polyculture
 Resilience (ecology)
 Rudolf Steiner
 Sustainability

Branches of sustainable agriculture 

 Fisheries management – protecting fishery resources in an effort to maintain sustainable fisheries
 Sustainable farming
 Sustainable forest management
 Sustainable gardening

Sustainable farming 

Sustainable farming
 Natural farming
 Masanobu Fukuoka

Perennial foods 

 Achillea millefolium
 Asparagus
 Blitum bonus-henricus
 Breadfruit
 Cassava
 Crambe maritima
 Fruit
 Herb
 Nut (fruit)
 Olericulture
 Perennial vegetable
 Rhubarb
 Sacred herbs
 Shrub
 Sium sisarum
 Sorrel
 Taro

Sustainable forestry management 

Sustainable forest management
 Coppicing
 Forest gardening
 Pollarding
 Short rotation coppice
 Woodland

Sustainable landscaping 

Sustainable landscaping
 A Sand County Almanac
 Aldo Leopold
 Biodiversity
 Calvert Vaux
 Central Park
 Ecology
 Ecosystem
 Food miles
 Frederick Law Olmsted
 John Muir
 Land ethic
 Sierra Club
 Soil food web

Approaches in sustainable agriculture

Hydroculture 

Hydroculture
 Aeroponics
 Aquaponics
 Hydroponics

Integrated pest control 

 Apiaceae
 Asteraceae
 Bee
 Beneficial insects
 Beneficial weed
 Biological pest control
 Bumblebee
 Chrysopidae
 Coccinellidae
 Companion planting
 Hoverfly
 Ichneumonoidea
 Insectary plant
 Integrated pest management
 List of beneficial weeds
 List of companion plants
 List of pest-repelling plants
 Pastured poultry
 Pollinator
Rotational Grazing
 Soldier beetle
 Tachinidae
 Trap crop
 Trichogramma

Permaculture 

Permaculture
 Berm
 Bill Mollison
 David Holmgren
 Holzer Permaculture
 Hügelkultur
 Keyline design
 P. A. Yeomans
 Sepp Holzer
 Swale (landform)

Regenerative agriculture 

 Biointensive agriculture
 Booker T. Whatley
 J. I. Rodale
 The Rodale Institute

Sustainable development 

 Agricultural economics
 Agronomy
 Community-supported agriculture
 Development economics
 Economic development
 Grameen Bank
 Microcredit
 Microfinance
 Muhammad Yunus
 Supply chain
 Value chain

Economic considerations 

 Action plan
 Cash flow
 Comparative advantage
 Competitive advantage
 Consumer behaviour
 Core competency
 Economies of scale
 Elasticity (economics)
 Enterprise life cycle
 Enterprise modelling
 Enterprise planning system
 Gross margin
 Land grabbing
 Micro-enterprise
 Opportunity cost
 Product differentiation
 Resource-based view
 Risk
 Risk management
 Social enterprise
 Socially optimal firm size
 Substitute good
 Supply and demand
 Uncertainty
 Water grabbing

Farming and natural resources 

 Water
 Aquaculture
 Aquaponics
 Aqueduct
 Aquifer
 Brackish water
 Dam
 Drainage basin
 Estuary
 Hydrology
 Lake
 Mariculture
 Reservoir
 River

 Land
 Soil
 Soil life
 Soil salination
 Soil science
 Terra preta

 Energy
 Biogas
 Biomass

 Air
 Arctic climate
 Climate
 Climate change
 Climate model
 Climate of the Alps
 Global climate change
 Meteorology
 Microclimate
 Microclimate
 Subarctic climate
 Temperate climate
 Wind

 Weather
 Extreme weather
 Meteorology
 Monsoon
 Precipitation
 Rain
 Severe weather
 Subtropical cyclone
 Weather forecasting
 Wind

 Vegetation, Plant, animal, List of domesticated plants, List of vegetables, List of herbs, List of fruit, List of domesticated animals, Cereal

 Biodiversity
 Allelopathy
 Artificial selection
 Commensalism
 Ecological selection
 Genetic erosion
 Halotolerance
 Heterosis
 Kin selection
 Natural selection
 Protocooperation
 Species
 Trophic level
 xerophyte

Sustainable agricultural practices 

 Genetic engineering
 Bioinformatics
 Biostatistics
 Biotechnology
 GIS

 Gardening
 Garden   (list)
 Edible schoolyard
 Indoor garden
 Wild garden
 Allotment (gardening)
 Forest gardening
 Grass
 Organic gardening
 Vegetable growing
 List of vegetables
 Water-wise gardening

 Herbicide
 Biocide
 Biological pest control
 Insecticide
 Integrated pest management
 List of companion plants
 Pesticide
 Push–pull technology

 Sustainable farming
 Aquaponics
 Buffer zone
 Cash crop
 Chillcuring
 Controlled burn
 Crop rotation
 Drip irrigation
 Fertilizer
 Good Agricultural Practices
 Grass (or Lawn)
 Grazing management
 Green manure
 Irrigation
 Living mulch
 Monoculture
 Multiple cropping
 Open pollination -Pollination management
 Orchard
 Polyculture
 Primary succession
 Raingauge
 Relay cropping
 Secondary succession
 Shifting cultivation
 Sowing
 Tillage
 Vermicomposting

 Wood
 List of forests
 Forestry
 Coppicing
 Deforestation
 Driftwood
 Logging
 Pollarding
 Reforestation
 Wildfire
 Woodland management

Rural development 
 Planning
 Regional planning
 Zoning
 Green Belt
 Hima
 Rural community development
 Landscape ecology
 Land use

Food and food transformation 
 Food
 Ethical eating
 Genetically modified food
 Organic food
 Local food
 Low carbon diet
 Food and agricultural policy
 Biosafety
 Chronic toxicity
 Slow Food
 Ark of taste
 Food quality
 Industrial ecology
 Heirloom plant

Economic, social and political context 
 Ecological Economics
 patrimony
 Total quality management
 Biosecurity
 Trade
 Safe trade
 Equity
 Smart growth
 Life cycle assessment
 Willingness-to-pay
 Cost-effectiveness
 Cost-benefit analysis
 Full cost accounting
 Utility
 Bioregional democracy
 Top-down approach
 Environment
 Environmental organization
 Environmental movement
 Environmentalism
 Radical environmentalism
 Environmental agreements
 Environmental law
 International environmental law
 Environmental finance
 Environmental economics
 Green economist
 Green economics
 Ecology movement -
 Land ethic
 Theoretical ecology
 Ecological
 Ecological niche
 Ecological selection

Individuals
 René Dumont
 Donella Meadows
 José Bové
 Masanobu Fukuoka
 Wes Jackson
 Bill Mollison
 Vandana Shiva
 Wendell Berry
 Willie Smits

Conventions, protocols, panels and summits
 Agenda 21
 NATURA 2000
 Biosafety protocol - Montreal 2000
 Convention on Biological Diversity
 Convention on Fishing and Conservation of Living Resources of the High Seas
 Convention on International Trade in Endangered Species of Wild Fauna and Flora (CITES)
 International Treaty on Plant Genetic Resources for Food and Agriculture
 United Nations Convention on the Law of the Sea
 Convention on Wetlands of International Importance Especially As Waterfowl Habitat
 Earth Summit 2002 (World summit on Sustainable Development), Johannesburg 2002
 International Seabed Authority
 International Tropical Timber Agreement, 1983
 Kyoto Protocol
 Common Agricultural Policy (CAP)
 Oxfam

Index
 Category: Sustainable agriculture

See also 

 Outline of agriculture
 Agrarianism
 Agriculture
 Arid-zone agriculture
 Agricultural engineering
 Agricultural science
 Agricultural science basic topics
 Agritourism
 Agroecology
 Allotment gardens
 Aquaponics
 Biodynamic agriculture
 Biogeography
 Collective farming
 Ecology
 Agricultural cooperative
 Forest gardening
 Intensive agriculture
 Mariculture
 Organic food
 Organic farming
 Organic gardening -Permaculture
 Precision agriculture
 Urban agriculture
 Water-wise gardening
 Sustainability
 Sustainable development
 Sustainable consumption
 Sustainable use
 Productivism
 Value of life
 Life-style choice
 Allotment (gardening)
 Green wall
 Eco-village
 Autonomous building
 Subsistence farming
 Nature
 Natural capitalism
 Natural medicine
 Natural order
 Natural resource
 Natural selection
 Environment
 Renewable resource
 Dynamic equilibrium
 Culture
 Cultural diversity
 Cultural Resources Management
 Ecotourism
 Ecological Economics
 Palm sugar
 Arenga pinnata

 Related lists
 Urban economics
 List of ecology topics
 List of environment topics
 List of ethics topics
 List of economics topics
 List of organic gardening and farming topics

References

External links 

 FoodPrint: Sustainable Agriculture vs. Industrial Agriculture
 Sustainable Agriculture Research & Education

 List
Sustainable agriculture
Ecology lists
Gardening lists
 *List
Sustainable agriculture
Sustainable agriculture